Gregory Jones Jr. (born March 7, 1998) is an American professional baseball shortstop in the Tampa Bay Rays organization.

Early life 
Jones was born in Cary, North Carolina. He is the son of Tammy and Greg Jones.

Jones attended Cary High School in Cary, North Carolina.

Career

Amateur career 
As a senior at Cary High School, he batted .429 with 18 stolen bases. He was ranked sixth in North Carolina and 133rd nationally by Perfect Game. He was selected by the Baltimore Orioles in the 17th round of the 2017 Major League Baseball draft, but did not sign. He instead chose to attend the University of North Carolina Wilmington where he played college baseball. 

In 2018, as a freshman at UNC Wilmington, Jones played and started sixty games, batting .278 with four home runs 21 RBIs, and 16 stolen bases. He played collegiate summer baseball for the Chatham Anglers of the Cape Cod Baseball League after the season, hitting .242 in 132 at-bats. In 2019, his sophomore year, he hit .341 with five home runs, 36 RBIs, and 42 stolen bases in 63 games, and was named the Colonial Athletic Association Player of the Year.

Professional career 
Jones was selected by the Tampa Bay Rays in the first round with the 22nd overall selection of the 2019 Major League Baseball draft. He signed with the Rays for $3 million.

Jones made his professional debut with the Hudson Valley Renegades of the Class A Short Season New York–Penn League. Over 48 games, he slashed .335/.413/.461 with one home run, 24 RBIs, and 19 stolen bases. Jones did not play a minor league game in 2020 due to the cancellation caused by the COVID-19 pandemic.

He began the 2021 season with the Bowling Green Hot Rods of the High-A East and was promoted to the Montgomery Biscuits of the Double-A South in August. He missed time during the season due to a quadriceps injury. Over 72 games between the two clubs, he slashed .270/.366/.482 with 14 home runs, forty RBIs, and 34 stolen bases. 

He opened the 2022 season back with Montgomery. Jones was optioned to the Triple-A Durham Bulls to begin the 2023 season.

Honors and awards 

 2018 All-Rookie Team, Colonial Athletic Association
 2018  All-Tournament, Colonial Athletic Association
 2019 First-team All-State
 2019 Bryan Britt Award, University of North Carolina Wilmington
 2019 All-Tournament, Colonial Athletic Association
 2019 Tournament Most Outstanding Player, Colonial Athletic Association
 2019 All-America (Third team), National Collegiate Baseball Writers Association
 2019 All-America (Third team), American Baseball Coaches Association
 2019 Player of the Year, Colonial Athletic Association
 2019 First-team All-Colonial Athletic Association
 2019 First-Team All-East, American Baseball Coaches Association

References

External links

1998 births
Living people
People from Cary, North Carolina
Baseball players from North Carolina
Baseball shortstops
UNC Wilmington Seahawks baseball players
Chatham Anglers players
Hudson Valley Renegades players
Bowling Green Hot Rods players
Montgomery Biscuits players